Arantxa Rus was the defending champion, but she did not participate that year.

Ksenia Pervak won the tournament, defeating Laura Robson in the final 6–3, 6–1.

Seeds

Draw

Finals

Top half

Section 1

Section 2

Bottom half

Section 3

Section 4

External links 
 Main draw

Girls' Singles
Australian Open, 2009 Girls' Singles